During the entire month of Ramadan, Muslims are obligated to fast (sawm; Persian: روزہ, rozeh), every day from dawn to sunset (or from dawn to night according to some scholars). Fasting requires the abstinence from sex, food and drink and smoking. Fasting the month of Ramadān was made obligatory (wājib) during the month of Sha‘bān, in the second year after the Muslims migrated from Makkah to Madīnah. Fasting the month of Ramadan is one of the Five Pillars of Islam.

The Qur'an
Fasting  during the month of Ramadan is specifically mentioned in three consecutive verses of the Qur'an:

O ye who believe! Fasting is prescribed to you as it was  prescribed to those before you, that ye may (learn) self-restraint.
—Surah Baqarah 2:183

(Fasting) for a fixed number of days; but if any of you is ill, or on a journey, the prescribed number (Should be made up) from days later. For those who can do it (With hardship), is a ransom, the feeding of one that is indigent. But he that will give more, of his own free will,- it is better for him. And it is better for you that ye fast, if ye only knew.
—Surah Baqarah 2:184

Prohibitions during Ramadan 

Eating, drinking, and sexual activities are not allowed between dawn (fajr), and sunset (maghrib). Fasting is considered an act of deeply personal worship in which Muslims seek a raised level of closeness to God. It helps them acknowledge Allah as the source of all sustenance.  

During Ramadan, Muslims are also expected to put more effort into following the teachings of Islam by refraining from violence, anger, envy, greed, lust, angry/sarcastic retorts, gossip, and are meant to try to get along with each other better than normal. All obscene and irreligious stimuli are to be avoided as the purity of both thought and action is important. This helps them develop a higher conscience of mindfulness of Allah.

Exceptions
Although fasting at Ramadan is fard (obligatory), exceptions are made for persons in particular circumstances. Fasting during Ramadan is not obligatory for several groups for whom it would be excessively problematic, among them people with a medical conditions. 

Pre-pubescent children are not required to fast, though some choose to do so, and some small children fast for half a day to train themselves. If puberty is delayed, fasting becomes obligatory for males and females after a certain age. Diabetics and nursing or pregnant women are usually not expected to fast. According to a hadith, observing the Ramadan fast is forbidden for menstruating women.

Other individuals for whom it is usually considered acceptable not to fast are those in battle, and travellers who either intend to spend fewer than five days away from home or travel more than 50 miles. If the circumstance preventing fasting is temporary, a person is required to make up for the missed days after the month of Ramadan is over and before the next Ramadan arrives. Should the circumstance be permanent or present for an extended amount of time, one may recompense by feeding a needy person for every day missed.

If one does not fit into any category of exemption and breaks the fast out of forgetfulness, the fast is still valid. Intentionally breaking the fast voids it, and the person must make up for the entire day later. One must either fast for 60 days after Ramadan or feed 60 people in need (according to the Hanafi school) and fast one day extra.

During a 2013 poliomyelitis outbreak in Somalia, some groups of aid workers were granted an exemption for the oral polio vaccine.

Other exemptions include:
 An elderly person who is not physically able to fast. They should donate the amount of a normal person's diet for each day missed if they are financially capable. 
 Serious illness; the days lost to illness will have to be made up after recovery.
 Those with a mental disability that is enough to cloud judgment.

Breaking the fast

Many mosques will provide iftar (literally: breakfast) meals after sundown for the community to come and end their day's fasting as a whole. It is also common for such meals to take place at Muslim soup kitchens. The fast is broken with a date (when possible) following the tradition of Prophet Muhammad, or with water.

Ramadan Iftar Dua
Ramadan fast is broken by reciting iftar dua:

Health effects 
Ramadan fasting is safe for healthy people provided that overall food and water intake is adequate but those with medical conditions should seek medical advice if they encounter health problems before or during fasting. The fasting period is usually associated with significant weight loss for both males and females, but weight can return after Ramadan depending on personal diet. Overall, Ramadan provides an opportunity to lose weight, but structured and consistent lifestyle modifications are necessary to achieve lasting weight loss. 

A review of the literature by an Iranian group suggested fasting during Ramadan might produce renal injury in patients with moderate (GFR <60 ml/min) or severe kidney disease but was not injurious to renal transplant patients with good function or most stone-forming patients. Also, it was suggested that Ramadan fasting may increase the risk for salivary gland inflammation.

Rulings for a fasting person
Linguistically, the word fasting in the Arabic language means unconditional 'restraint' (imsak) from any action or speech during any time.
According to the Sacred Law, fasting is the act of:

refraining from entering anything into the body cavity;
refraining from engaging in sexual activity;
refraining from immoral acts such as backbiting;
from the time the sun begins to rise to the time the sun sets; 

'Refraining from engaging in sexual activity' includes actual sexual intercourse and ejaculation caused by foreplay. 'Refraining from entering anything into the body cavity' refers to the acts of entering food, drink, or medicine into the body cavity, regardless of whether this is a typical item one would enter into the body cavity or not. Entering any of these substances inside the body cavity means that the substance enters into the throat, the intestines, the stomach, or the brain by way of the nose, the throat, the private parts, or open wounds. 'Whether deliberately or accidentally' excludes forgetful acts of eating, drinking, or sexual activity. 'From the time the sun begins to rise to the time the sun sets' refers to the true entering of the Fajr time to the entering of the Maghrib time. 'Accompanied with the intention of fasting' means that one must intend to fast in order to distinguish if one is really performing an act of worship or not when one refrains from eating, drinking, or having sexual intercourse. For example, if one were to merely stay away from food, drink, or sexual activity without an intention to fast, then this fast is not valid and does not count. 'From individuals who are permitted to fast' means that one must be free from a situation that would prevent the validity of one's fast, such as menstruation or lochia (post-natal bleeding).[Shurunbulali, Maraqi al-Falah; Ala al-Din Abidin, al-Hadiyya al-Alaiyya; Shurunbulali Imdad al-Fattah]. Apart from sexual intercourse either with spouse or anyone, masturbation is also strictly prohibited while fasting. This act will invariably break the fast, and the person who committed this act will have to repent to Allah and should cover up this fast on a later date.

Sectarian differences 

For the most part, Sunnis and Shias observe Ramadan the same way, but there are some differences. For one, Sunnis break their fast at sunset, once the sun is no longer visible, but there is still light in the sky. However, for Shias they wait to break after it gets completely dark. Shia Muslims also observe additional events that Sunnis do not. They mourn for three days (on the 19th, 20th, and 21st) to commemorate Ali, the son in law of Muhammad and first Imam of the Shia, who was assassinated by Abd al-Rahman ibn Muljam.

Sufi Muslims have some variations on how they observe Ramadan and what it means to them. They follow the same rules when fasting, but they recite extra prayers at midnight. The practice they do is called Dhikr, where they chant God’s name 99 times. This is done because they want to show their love for God and seek a personal relationship with God, as opposed to fearing God's wrath.

Eid al-Fitr

The Islamic holiday of Eid al-Fitr marks the end of the Islamic fasting of the month of Ramadan.

References

Ramadan
Fasting in Islam